Columbia University in New York City, New York, has seen numerous instances of student protests, particularly beginning in the late 20th century.

History

1936 protest against Nazis 
In 1936, Robert Burke, CC '38 led a rally outside President Butler's mansion to protest Columbia's friendly relationship with the Nazis. Burke was expelled, and was never readmitted. The university has never apologized for expelling him.

Protests of 1968 

Students initiated a major demonstration in 1968 over two main issues. The first was Columbia's proposed gymnasium in neighboring Morningside Park, perceived as a segregated facility, with limited access by the black residents of neighboring Harlem. A second issue was the Columbia administration's failure to resign its institutional membership in the Pentagon's weapons research think-tank, the Institute for Defense Analyses (IDA). Students barricaded themselves inside Low Library, Hamilton Hall, and several other university buildings during the protests, and New York City police were called onto the campus to arrest or forcibly remove the students.

The protests achieved two of their stated goals. Columbia disaffiliated from the IDA and scrapped the plans for the controversial gym, building a subterranean physical fitness center under the north end of campus instead. A popular myth states that the gym's plans were eventually used by Princeton University for the expansion of its athletic facilities, but as Jadwin Gymnasium was already 50% complete by 1966 (when the Columbia gym was announced) this was clearly not correct. At least 30 Columbia students were suspended by the administration as a result of the protests. Many of the Class of '68 walked out of their graduation and held a counter-commencement on Low Plaza with a picnic following at Morningside Park, the place where the protests began. The protests hurt Columbia financially as many potential students chose to attend other universities and some alumni refused to donate money to the school.

Protests against racism and apartheid 
Further student protests, including hunger strike and more barricades of Hamilton Hall and the Business School during the late 1970s and early 1980s, were aimed at convincing the university trustees to divest all of the university's investments in companies that were seen as active or tacit supporters of the apartheid regime in South Africa. A notable upsurge in the protests occurred in 1978, when following a celebration of the tenth anniversary of the student uprising in 1968, students marched and rallied in protest of university investments in South Africa. The Committee Against Investment in South Africa (CAISA) and numerous student groups including the Socialist Action Committee, the Black Student Organization and the Gay Students group joined together and succeeded in pressing for the first partial divestment of a U.S. university.

The initial (and partial) Columbia divestment focused largely on bonds and financial institutions directly involved with the South African regime. It followed a year-long campaign first initiated by students who had worked together to block the appointment of former United States Secretary of State Henry Kissinger to an endowed chair at the university in 1977.

Broadly backed by student groups and many faculty members the Committee Against Investment in South Africa held teach-ins and demonstrations through the year focused on the trustees ties to the corporations doing business with South Africa. Trustee meetings were picketed and interrupted by demonstrations culminating in May 1978 in the takeover of the Graduate School of Business.

Columbia Unbecoming 

In the early 2000s, professor Joseph Massad, held an elective course called Palestinian and Israeli Politics and Societies at Columbia. Students felt the views he espoused in the course were anti-Israel and some of them tried to disrupt his class and get him fired. In 2004, students got together with the pro-Israel campus group the David Project and produced a film called Columbia Unbecoming, accusing Massad and two other professors of intimidating or treating unfairly students with pro-Israel views. The film led to a committee being appointed by Bollinger which exonerated the professors in the spring of 2005. However, the committee's report criticized Columbia's inadequate grievance procedures.

Ahmadinejad speech controversy 

The School of International and Public Affairs extends invitations to heads of state and heads of government who come to New York City for the opening of the fall session of the United Nations General Assembly. In 2007, Iranian President Mahmoud Ahmadinejad was one of those invited to speak on campus. Ahmadinejad accepted his invitation and spoke on September 24, 2007, as part of Columbia University's World Leaders Forum. The invitation proved to be highly controversial. Hundreds of demonstrators swarmed the campus on September 24 and the speech itself was televised worldwide. University President Lee C. Bollinger tried to allay the controversy by letting Ahmadinejad speak, but with a negative introduction (given personally by Bollinger). This did not mollify those who were displeased with the fact that the Iranian leader had been invited onto the campus. Columbia students, though, turned out en masse to listen to the speech on the South Lawn. An estimated 2,500 undergraduates and graduates came out for the historic occasion.

During his speech, Ahmadinejad criticized Israel's policies towards the Palestinians; called for research on the historical accuracy of the Holocaust; raised questions as to who initiated the 9/11 attacks; defended Iran's nuclear power program, criticizing the UN's policy of sanctions on his country; and attacked U.S. foreign policy in the Middle East. In response to a question about Iran's treatment of women and homosexuals, he asserted that women are respected in Iran and that "In Iran, we don't have homosexuals like in your country… In Iran, we do not have this phenomenon. I don't know who told you this." The latter statement drew laughter from the audience. The Manhattan District Attorney's Office accused Columbia of accepting grant money from the Alavi Foundation to support faculty "sympathetic" to Iran's Islamic republic.

ROTC controversy 
Beginning in 1969, during the Vietnam War, the university did not allow the U.S. military to have Reserve Officers' Training Corps (ROTC) programs on campus, though Columbia students could participate in ROTC programs at other local colleges and universities. At a forum at the university during the 2008 presidential election campaign, both John McCain and Barack Obama said that the university should consider reinstating ROTC on campus. After the debate, the president of the university, Lee C. Bollinger, stated that he did not favor reinstating Columbia's ROTC program, because of the military's anti-gay policies. In November 2008, Columbia's undergraduate student body held a referendum on the question of whether or not to invite ROTC back to campus, and the students who voted were almost evenly divided on the issue. ROTC lost the vote (which would not have been binding on the administration, and did not include graduate students, faculty, or alumni) by a fraction of a percentage point.

In April 2010 during Admiral Mike Mullen's address at Columbia, President Lee C. Bollinger stated that the ROTC would be readmitted to campus if the admiral's plans for revoking the don't ask, don't tell policy were successful. In February 2011 during one of three town-hall meetings on the ROTC ban, former Army staff sergeant Anthony Maschek, a Purple Heart recipient for injuries sustained during his service in Iraq, was booed and hissed at by some students during his speech promoting the idea of allowing the ROTC on campus. In April 2011 the Columbia University Senate voted to welcome the ROTC program back on campus. Secretary of the Navy Ray Mabus and Columbia University President Lee C. Bollinger signed an agreement to reinstate Naval Reserve Officers Training Corps (NROTC) program at Columbia for the first time in more than 40 years on May 26, 2011.

Divestment from private prisons 
In February 2014, after learning that the university had over $10 million invested in the private prison industry, a group of students delivered a letter President Bollinger's office requesting a meeting and officially launching the Columbia Prison Divest (CPD) campaign. , Columbia held investments in Corrections Corporation of America, the largest private prison company in the United States, as well as G4S, the largest multinational security firm in the world. Students demanded that the university divest these holdings from the industry and instate a ban on future investments in the private prison industry. Aligning themselves with the growing Black Lives Matter movement and in conversation with the heightened attention on race and the system of mass incarceration, CPD student activists hosted events to raise awareness of the issue and worked to involve large numbers of members of the Columbia and West Harlem community in campaign activities. After eighteen months of student driven organizing, the Board of Trustees of Columbia University voted to support the petition for divestment from private prison companies, which was confirmed to student leaders on June 22, 2015. The Columbia Prison Divest campaign was the first campaign to successfully get a U.S. university to divest from the private prison industry.

Tuition strike 

In January 2021, more than 1000 Columbia University students initiated a tuition strike, demanding that the university lower its tuition rates by 10% amid financial burdens and the move to online classes prompted by the COVID-19 pandemic. Tuition for undergraduates is $58,920 for an academic year, and the total costs eclipse $80,000 when expenses including fees, room and board, books and travel are factored in. It is the largest tuition strike at the university in nearly 50 years. Students have stated they have won a number of concessions, as the university announced it would freeze tuition, suspend fees on late payments, increase spring financial aid and provide a limited amount of summer grants. A university spokesperson, however, stated that the decisions occurred several months prior to the strike. Students have also asked the university to end its expansion into and gentrification of West Harlem, defund its university police force, to divest from its investments in oil and gas companies, and bargain in good faith with campus unions. The university in February 2021 announced that the Board of Trustees had finally formalized its commitment to divest from publicly traded oil and gas companies. The strike had been largely organized by the campus chapter of Young Democratic Socialists of America, which had partnered with other student groups to support the action.

Starting in March 2021, members of the Student Workers of Columbia–United Auto Workers (a student employee union) have been on strike over issues related to securing a labor contract with the university.

References 

Culture of Columbia University
Student protests in New York (state)
Student politics